Barry John Murphy (born 28 November 1982) is a former Irish rugby union player. He played for Munster in the Celtic League and the Heineken Cup.  Murphy announced his retirement from rugby in May 2011 due to a series of serious injuries.

Sporting career 
Murphy gained the man of the match accolade against the Sale Sharks in Thomond Park in January 2006, and was a part of the Munster squad which won the Heineken Cup later that year - although Murphy injured his ankle in a Celtic League game against Ulster in March 2006 and did not compete for the remainder of the season.

Personal life
He is in a band called Hermitage Green. As of October 2017, Murphy co-hosts a podcast called Potholes and Penguins with fellow ex-Irish rugby international, Andrew Trimble.

References

External links
St Munchin's College
Munster profile
IRFU profile
ESPNscrum profile

1982 births
Ireland international rugby union players
Munster Rugby players
UL Bohemians R.F.C. players
Living people
People educated at St Munchin's College
Rugby union players from County Limerick
Ireland Wolfhounds international rugby union players
Rugby union centres